The Musée des Beaux-Arts de Bordeaux is the fine arts museum of the city of Bordeaux, France. The museum is housed in a dependency of the Palais Rohan in central Bordeaux. Its collections include paintings, sculptures and drawings from the 15th century to the 20th century. The largest collection is composed of paintings, and its strong points are works by French and Dutch painters. 

In front of the building, there is the Galerie des Beaux-Arts, where temporary exhibitions are housed.

History 

Established in 1801 by the painter Pierre Lacour, it is one of the largest art galleries in France outside Paris. The museum holds several paintings that were looted by the French during the French Revolution (so-called 'saisies révolutionnaires') such as the Martyrdom of Saint Georges by Peter Paul Rubens.

First hosted in a library and then in a room of the town hall, the collection was moved into the current building after its construction from 1875 to 1881. The Galerie des Beaux-Arts was built later, from 1936 to 1939.

Painting collection

Here is a list of some of the painters represented in the museum collections:

Abraham Govaerts
Abraham Hondius
Albert Marquet: Naples, the steamer
Alessandro Magnasco
Alfred Smith
Allan Ramsay
André Lhote
Antoine-Jean Gros
Antonio Bellucci
Anthony van Dyck
Artus Wolffort
Auguste Renoir: Landscape of Cagnes
Jean-Joseph Benjamin-Constant: Moroccan prisoners
Benjamin West: Three paintings
Camille Corot: Diana bathing
Camille Roqueplan
Carle Vernet
Horace Vernet
Carle Vernet
Charles-François Daubigny: The banks of the Oise
Chaïm Soutine: L'homme bleu sur la route (La montée de Cagnes)Domenico Pellegrini
Édouard Joseph Dantan
Eugène Boudin: Low Tide at ÉtaplesEugène Delacroix: Greece on the ruins of MissolonghiEugène Isabey
François-André Vincent
Félix Ziem
Giacomo Legi
Giorgio Vasari
Giambattista Pittoni
Giovanni Boldini
Giovanni Do
Hendrick Ter Brugghen
Henri Gervex
Henri Martin
Henri Matisse: Portrait of BevilacquaHerman van Swanevelt
Jacques Blanchard
Jacques Raymond Brascassat
Jan Davidsz de Heem
Jan Brueghel the Younger
Jan Porcellis
Jan van Goyen
Jean Restout
Jean Siméon Chardin: Still life with meatJean-Baptiste Perronneau
Jean-Joseph Taillasson
Jean-Léon Gérôme
Jean-Marc Nattier
Jean-Paul Laurens
Jean-Pierre Alexandre Antigna
Johann Friedrich August Tischbein
Johan Joseph Zoffany: The Triumph of VenusJohn Lewis Brown
Joos de Momper
Joshua Reynolds
Perugino
Louis Valtat
Luca Giordano
Léon Cogniet
Mary Cassatt
Melchior d'Hondecoeter
Narcisse Virgilio Díaz
Nicolaes Maes
Odilon Redon
Oskar Kokoschka
Pablo Picasso: Olga readingPaul Baudry
Paolo Veronese
Pierre Bonnard
Pietro da Cortona
Pierre-Narcisse Guérin
Peter Paul Rubens
Rigoberto Perez Soler:Idyll Ibiza''
Théodore Gudin
Thomas Couture
Thomas Lawrence
Tiziano Vecellio known as Titian
Trophime Bigot
William-Adolphe Bouguereau

Gallery

References

External links
Official Website (english version)

Art museums and galleries in France
Museums in Bordeaux
FRAME Museums
Art museums established in 1801
Musée des Beaux-Arts de Bordeaux